Nationality words link to articles with information on the nation's poetry or literature (for instance, Irish or France).

Events
c. 1411–13 – Thomas Hoccleve writes Regement of Princes or De Regimine Principum for Henry, Prince of Wales.

Works published
1413 – The Pilgrimage of the Soul

Births
Death years link to the corresponding "[year] in poetry" article:

1410:
Martin le Franc (died 1461), French poet of the late Middle Ages and early Renaissance
 Masuccio Salernitano (died 1475), Italian poet
 Cuacuauhtzin (died 1440), Aztec lord and poet in the Pre-Columbian nahua world
 Dafydd Gorlech (died 1490), Welsh language poet

1411:
 Juan de Mena (died 1456), Spanish poet appointed veinticuatro (one of twenty-four aldermen) of Córdoba, secretario de cartas  (secretary of Latin letters) and cronista real (royal chronicler)

1412:
 (c.1412–1420) Guto'r Glyn (died c.1493), Welsh language poet
 Gómez Manrique (died 1490), Spanish poet, soldier, politician and dramatist

1413:
 Saint Catherine of Bologna (died 1463), Italian saint, abbess, visionary, calligrapher, miniaturist and poet

1414:
 Jami (died 1492), Persian scholar, mystic, writer, composer of numerous lyrics and idylls, historian, and Sufi poet
 Narsinh Mehta, alternate spelling: Narasingh Mehta, born about this year (died 1481), Indian, Gujarati-language Hindu poet-saint notable as a bhakta, an exponent of Hindu devotional religious poetry; acclaimed as Adi Kavi (Sanskrit for "first among poets") of Gujarat, where he is especially revered

Deaths
Birth years link to the corresponding "[year] in poetry" article:

1410:
 Jaume March II (born 1334), Catalan language poet

1411:
 Jean Petit (born 1360), French theologian, poet and professor

1417:
 Imadaddin Nasimi (born 1369), Turkic Ḥurūfī and mystical poet

1418:
 Laurent de Premierfait (born 1380), Latin poet, a humanist, and translator

See also

 Poetry
 15th century in poetry
 15th century in literature

Notes

15th-century poetry
Poetry